This is a list of fellows of the Royal Society elected in 1702.

Fellows
 John Chamberlayne (c. 1666–1723)
 Jean Chardellou (c. 1664–1771)
 George Cheyne (1671–1743)
 John Lowthorp (c. 1659–1724)
 Ludlow (fl. 1702)
 Abraham de la Pryme (1672–1704)
 Robert Tompson (c. 1676–1713)
 Michael Le Vassor (c. 1648–1718)
 James Vernon (c. 1677–1756)
 James Yonge (1647–1721)

References

1702
1702 in science
1702 in England